Thomas James Luchsinger (born February 28, 1991) is an American swimmer who specializes in butterfly events. At the 2013 US national championships, he won the national championship in the 200m butterfly and qualified for the 2013 World Aquatics Championships in Barcelona with a time of 1:55.57. The Atlantic Coast Conference named him Swimmer of the Year in 2013.

Luchsinger attended Mount Sinai High School and graduated from the University of North Carolina in 2013. He came out as gay in an essay in Outsports in December 2014.

Coaching career

Luchsinger currently coaches with in the greater New York area with the private coaching service, CoachUp.

References

External links

 
 
 Tom Luchsinger, University of North Carolina athlete profile at GoHeels.com

1991 births
Living people
American male butterfly swimmers
North Carolina Tar Heels men's swimmers
Sportspeople from New York (state)
People from Mount Sinai, New York
American LGBT sportspeople
Gay sportsmen
LGBT people from New York (state)
LGBT swimmers
20th-century American people
21st-century American people